There are a number of commonly occurring weeds or invasive plant species in Queensland, Australia. These plants typically produce large numbers of seeds, often excellent at surviving and reproducing in disturbed environments and are commonly the first species to colonise and dominate in these conditions. Weeds may reduce native biodiversity, affect agricultural productivity, the environment, human health and amenity.

Common weeds 
Some of the more common weeds of Queensland are listed below. Weeds that are not yet common or established but pose a significant threat are identified by an asterisk. Weeds that are identified as Weeds of National Significance are noted as "WoNS".

See also 
 Introduced species
 Invasion biology terminology for a review of the terminology used in invasion biology.
 Invasive species in Australia
 List of invasive species
 Queensland
 Weed Science

References

Further reading

External links 
 Weeds & pest animal management Queensland Government, Department of Natural Resources and Water
 Weeds Australia An Australian Weeds Committee National Initiative
 Weeds CRC Cooperative Research Centre for Australian Weed Management
 Global Invasive Species Database (GISD) Invasive Species Specialist Group (ISSG) of the Species Survival Commission of the IUCN-World Conservation Union
 Invasive Species.org US Information and Perspective on Invasive and Exotic Weeds

Queensland
Weeds
Weeds